The SnakeBot, also known as a snake robot, is a biomorphic hyper-redundant robot that resembles a biological snake. Snake robots come in many shapes and sizes, from as long as four stories (earthquake SnakeBot developed by SINTEF) to a medical SnakeBot developed at Carnegie Mellon University that is thin enough to maneuver around organs inside a human chest cavity.  Though SnakeBots can very greatly in size and design, there are two qualities that all SnakeBot share. The small cross-section-to-length ratios allow them to move into and maneuver through tight spaces and their ability to change the shape of their bodies allows them to perform a wide range of behaviors, such as climbing stairs or tree trunks. Additionally, many snake robots are constructed by chaining together several independent links.  This redundancy can make them resistant to failure because they can continue to operate even if parts of their body are destroyed. Properties such as high terrainability, redundancy, and the possibility of complete sealing of the body of the robot, make snake robots very interesting for practical applications and hence as a research topic. A SnakeBot is different from a snake-arm robot in that the SnakeBot robot types are usually more self-contained, where a snake-arm robot usually has remote mechanicals from the arm itself, possibly connected to a larger system.

Applications

Snakebots are used in situations where their characteristics give them an advantage over their environment. These environments tend to be long and thin like pipes or highly cluttered like rubble. Thus, Snakebots are currently being developed to assist search and rescue teams. When a task requires several different obstacles to be overcome, the locomotive flexibility of SnakeBots potentially offers an advantage.

Snakebots can also be used by animal control officers to subdue rabid or invasive creatures. Raccoons, barn cats, and large rodents typically respond to the Snakebot's presence with attacks upon which the SnakeBot may respond by emitting an electrical shock to paralyze the aggressor.

Locomotion
Traditional SnakeBots move by changing the shape of their body, similar to actual snakes.  Many variants have been created which use wheels or treads for movement.  No SnakeBots have been developed yet that can completely mimic the locomotion of real snakes, but researchers have been able to produce new ways of moving that do not occur in nature.

When researchers refer to how a SnakeBot moves they often refer to a specific gait, where a gait is just a periodic mode of locomotion.  For example, sidewinding and lateral undulation are both gaits.  SnakeBot gaits are often designed by investigating period changes to the shape of the robot. For example, a caterpillar moving by changing the shape of its body to match a sinusoidal wave.  Similarly, SnakeBot can move by adapting their shape to different periodic functions. Sidewinder rattlesnakes can use sidewinding to ascend sandy slopes by increasing the portion of the body in contact with the sand to match the reduced yielding force of the inclined sand, allowing them to ascend to the maximum possible sand slope without slip.  Implementing this control scheme in a SnakeBot capable of sidewinding allowed the robot to replicate the success of the snakes.

Current research
SnakeBots are currently being researched as a new type of robotic, interplanetary probe by engineers at the NASA Ames Research Center. Software for SnakeBot is also being developed by NASA for them to be able to learn by experiencing the skills to scale obstacles and remember the techniques.

Snake robots are also being developed for search and rescue purposes at Carnegie Mellon University's Biorobotics Lab.

See also
 Snake-arm robot
 Roboboa

References

External links
 ROBOTNOR - The Norwegian Centre for Advanced Robotics at NTNU and SINTEF
 SINTEF's web pages
 Carnegie Mellon University's snake robots
 Modular Snake Robots
 University of Michigan's OmniTread Serpentine Robot
 How Stuff Works Snakebot
 Robot Snakes of Dr. Gavin Miller
 Serpentronic Robot Snake Project
 Carnegie Mellon’s Incredible Robot Snake Climbs a Real Tree
 The next 'new frontier' of artificial intelligence
 Sneel Swimming Snake Robot